The St. Charles Borromeo Cathedral (also São Carlos Cathedral) is a Catholic church located in the Don José Marcondes Homem de Melo Square, in São Carlos (São Paulo) in the South American country of Brazil.

The cathedral was built on the site where the first chapel was erected, between the streets Conde do Pinhal and Trece de Mayo, in the central area. The project was designed by engineer Emanuel Gianni with a model by professor Ernfrid Frick and structural design by engineer . It has stained glass windows by Lorenz Helmair, the altars are made of Carrara marble and the Via Sacra was made by local artist Almira Ragonesi Bruno. The image of St. Charles Borromeo dating from the city's foundation, with head and hands carved in wood, is in the cathedral.

With the creation of the Diocese of São Carlos, on June 7, 1908, the Church of São Carlos was elevated to the category of cathedral.

See also
Roman Catholicism in Brazil
St. Charles Borromeo

References

Roman Catholic cathedrals in São Paulo (state)
Church buildings with domes